Kalateh-ye Avaz (also Romanized as Kalāteh-ye ‘Avaẕ and Kalāteh ‘Avaz; also known as Asadābād and Kalāteh-ye Asad) is a village in Golbibi Rural District, Marzdaran District, Sarakhs County, Razavi Khorasan Province, Iran. At the 2006 census, its population was 764, in 181 families.

This village is located 92 km southwest of Sarakh city, near Bazangan and on the eastern slope of Bazangan mountain range. Its altitude is 1100 meters above sea level and its climate is temperate and dry mountainous.

Natural and historical attractions 

 Karkas Cave
 Historic tower
 Gardens and apple orchards
 An aqueduct
 Pistachio forest of Kalateh-ye Avaz

References 

Populated places in Sarakhs County